Diduga metaleuca is a moth of the family Erebidae. It is found in the Philippines.

References

Nudariina
Moths described in 1918